Zurial Togiatama (born 3 February 1999) is a Fijian rugby union player who plays for Fijian Drua in the Super Rugby competition. His playing position is hooker.

Reference list

External links
itsrugby.co.uk profile

1999 births
New Zealand rugby union players
Living people
Rugby union hookers
Counties Manukau rugby union players
Fijian Drua players
Fijian rugby union players
Fiji international rugby union players